Škoda 28 T (also known as Škoda ForCity Classic) is a five-carbody section low-floor bi-directional tram, developed by Škoda Transportation for the Konya Tram system in the Turkish city of Konya. The low-floor area of the fully air-conditioned tram constitutes the entire vehicle floor. Konya ordered 60 units. It is based on the Škoda 26 T for Miskolc.

In 2014, Konya ordered 12 additional units capable of catenary-free operation for a new Konya Tram line which will have a  section without overhead wires.

Design 
The tram is a five section air-conditioned high capacity electric multiple unit with three fixed bogies and 6 doors on each side of the carriage. 100% of the tram is low-floor. The tram itself is built out of materials with high fire resistance, since it is also constructed as a light subway unit.

Interior 
The tram has to meet specific criteria in the city of Konya. Unlike its predecessor, 26T, 28T has enhanced high-power air-conditioning, both for the driver and for the passengers. It also has the ability to be run in a 2 vehicle train setup. The tram has integrated passenger LED information system built right into the overhead ceiling, between the sections. The on-board computer is BUS-TEC. Outer information panels are also made by BUS-TEC. Wi-Fi and acoustic information system is provided.

Škoda 28T2 
A special variant of the tram has been developed at Škoda Transportation. It's the same type of the 28T tram, however, it includes much larger internal capacitors, allowing the tram to run on batteries for at least 3 km. This was requested by the city of Konya, as there is a section of unelectrified track (approximately 1.7 km). The colors of the vehicle are different from the standard 28T.

References

External links 

 Škoda 28 T on Škoda Transportation webpages

Škoda trams